David Ferrer defeated José Acasuso 6–4, 3–6, 6–7(3–7), 7–5, 6–4 to win the 2006 Mercedes Cup singles event.

Seeds

Draws

Key
Q - Qualifier
WC - Wild Card
r - Retired
LL - Lucky loser
w/o - Walkover

Finals

Section 1

Section 2

Section 3

Section 4

External links
Association of Tennis Professionals (ATP) draw
Association of Tennis Professionals (ATP) Qualifying draw

Stuttgart Open Singles
Singles 2006